

A total solar eclipse occurred on 3 May 1715. It was known as Halley's Eclipse, after Edmond Halley (1656–1742) who predicted this eclipse to within 4 minutes accuracy. Halley observed the eclipse from London where the city of London enjoyed 3 minutes 33 seconds of totality. He also drew a predictive map showing the path of totality across the Kingdom of Great Britain. The original map was about 20 miles off the observed eclipse path, mainly due to his use of inaccurate lunar ephemeris.  After the eclipse, he corrected the eclipse path, and added the path and description of the 1724 total solar eclipse.

Drawing upon lunar tables made by the first Astronomer Royal John Flamsteed, William Whiston produced a more technical predictive eclipse map around the same time as Halley. Both Halley's and Whiston's maps were published by John Senex in March 1715.

Totality was observed in the Kingdom of Great Britain from Cornwall in the south-west to Lincolnshire and Norfolk in the east.  It was also observed in Ireland, where large crowds turned out in Dublin to watch it: the weather in Dublin  was exceptionally cold and wet, and the eminent judge Joseph Deane caught a fatal chill as a result, although Elrington Ball more prosaically states that  his death was probably due to gout.

Note: Great Britain did not adopt the Gregorian calendar until 1752, so the date was at the time considered 22 April 1715.

Related eclipses 
It is a part of Solar Saros 114.

See also 
 List of solar eclipses visible from the United Kingdom 1000–2090 AD

References

 NASA chart graphics
 Googlemap
 NASA Besselian elements

External links 

 Total Eclipses of the Sun, By Mabel Loomis Todd, 1894, new and revised edition by David Peck Todd, 1900.
 Halley's eclipse Hans van der Meer's Eclipse Page
  Halley is credited with the first eclipse map showing the path of the Moon's shadow across England during the upcoming total eclipse of 1715.
 Halley's Maps and Descriptions of the 1715 Total Solar Eclipse
   Edmund Halley, Observations of the Late Total Eclipse of the Sun on the 22d of April Last Past, Made before the Royal Society at Their House in Crane-Court in Fleet-Street, London. by Dr. Edmund Halley, Reg. Soc. Secr. with an Account of What Has Been Communicated from Abroad concerning the Same, Phil Trans R Soc 1714 29: 245–262.
 Whiston's predictive map of March 1715

Further reading
 Walters, A.N. (1999) "English Broadsides of Early Eighteenth-century Solar Eclipses"

1715 5 3
1715 in science
1715 5 3